The Jetsons is a comic series spun off from The Jetsons animated series. Various comic book publishers have created their own versions.

The 2017 comic book by DC Comics reimagines the 1960s Hanna Barbera properties alongside Scooby Apocalypse, Wacky Raceland and Future Quest.

This series was written by Jimmy Palmiotti (Harley Quinn) and illustrated by Pier Brito. The cover collection is by Amanda Conner (Harley Quinn, Convergence: Action Comics). It collects The Jetsons #1-6, as well as an 8-page story from Booster Gold/Flintstones Special #1. In short, the story takes place a few years after the animated series, and tells the story of Jane and George trying to stop the course of a meteor heading towards their planet that will eradicate all human life. In this comic series, the origin of Rosie, the family's mechanical maid, is told. Rosie is revealed to be the sub-conscious of George's mother uploaded into a robotic shell.

Publications
The Jetsons #1 (2017-11-01)
The Jetsons #2 (2017-12-06)
The Jetsons #3 (2018-01-03)
The Jetsons #4 (2018-02-07)
The Jetsons #5 (2018-03-07): ROSIE to the RESCUE!
The Jetsons #6 (2018-04-04)
The Jetsons (2018-07-04): Includes #1-6.

Reception
The 2017 comic gained a mostly positive reception from critics.

References

The Jetsons
Hanna-Barbera comics
Science fiction comics
Comics based on television series
DC Comics titles
Humor comics
Harvey Comics titles
Marvel Comics titles
Charlton Comics titles
Blackthorne Publishing titles
Archie Comics titles
Gold Key Comics titles
Dell Comics titles
Comic book reboots